Constantine: City of Demons is an American animated web series based on the DC Comics character John Constantine, a demon hunter and occult detective. It is a loose adaptation of the graphic novel Hellblazer: All His Engines by writer Mike Carey and artist Leonardo Manco. Tangentially tied to the live-action series Constantine through actor Matt Ryan, the series is set in the DC Animated Movie Universe, connecting it to the 2017 animated film Justice League Dark.  The first half was initially released as five separate episodes on the streaming platform CW Seed on March 24, 2018, after premiering at WonderCon. The series was released as a feature-length film released on DVD and Blu-ray on October 9 and later compiled and completed as two episodes on CW Seed on January 17, 2019.

Cast and characters 
 Matt Ryan as John Constantine: A seasoned demon hunter and master of the occult. Ryan also voices the Constantine Demons.
 Damian O'Hare as Chas Chandler: A long time friend of Constantine since childhood. O'Hare was the voice of John Constantine in Justice League Action.
 Laura Bailey as Asa the Healer / Nightmare Nurse, Trish Chandler.
 Emily O'Brien as Renee Chandler
 Rachel Kimsey as Angela The Queen of Angels, the plane announcer
 Robin Atkin Downes as Butler, Nergal
 Jim Meskimen as Beroul / Nergal, Cheleb, Quedbas
 Kevin Michael Richardson as Mahonin, old man possessed by Angela
 Rick D. Wasserman as Mictlantecuhtli

Production 
Matt Ryan reprised his role from the live-action series as John Constantine in the animated series, after having made a guest appearance in Arrows fourth season. The CW president Mark Pedowitz noted at the time that there were not discussions regarding whether or not any other characters from the live-action series might appear in the web series, or if this version of the character would "connect back to the live-action storylines he's been a part of".

The series was developed by Warner Bros. Animation, Berlanti Productions, and Blue Ribbon Content, with Greg Berlanti, Sarah Schechter, and David S. Goyer serving as executive producers, and Butch Lukic as producer. J. M. DeMatteis wrote the series, which was directed by Doug Murphy. The series is an adaptation of the graphic novel All His Engines. Warner Bros. Animation and Blue Ribbon Content Vice President Peter Girardi said the series aimed to be "darker" than the live-action series, and closer to the Hellblazer comics published by DC's imprint Vertigo.

While it was originally stated that City of Demons would tie into the live-action series Constantine, the two series differ significantly from one another with different takes on characters and plot points. According to J. M. DeMatteis, the series is not a continuation of Constantine, but is in the same universe as the 2017 film Justice League Dark. Peter Girardi referred to the show as part of the "Constantine animated universe".

Episodes

Release 
The first half of Constantine: City of Demons was released as five short episodes on CW Seed, on March 24, 2018, after premiering the same day at WonderCon. Writer J. M. DeMatteis later confirmed that seven more episodes were planned for release, as well as a DVD and Blu-ray release featuring 20 minutes of extra footage, similar to Vixen: The Movie. The feature-length version was later released on Blu-ray and digital on October 9, following a special screening at New York Comic Con on October 4. The series made its broadcast debut on The CW on October 15, hosted by Ryan under the title Constantine: The Legend Continues. After the first half was initially released as five separate episodes, the series was later compiled and completed as two episodes on CW Seed on January 17, 2019.

Reception 
Jesse Schedeen of IGN awarded the first half of the series an 8.1 out of 10, noting the episodes "build a straightforward but enjoyable conflict featuring the wily magician, and they serve as a reminder that Matt Ryan is a terrific fit for this character in either live-action or animation". Schedeen later awarded the completed movie 7.5 out of 10, noting that the plot does "drag a bit in the middle" but "gathers steam again by the time the climax rolls around".

Renee Schonfeld of Common Sense Media, awarding the movie 3 out of 5 stars, said that the movie's "distinctive animation, rousing battles, and top-notch vocal performances serve this off-beat DC Comic 'hero' well -- with a caution that it's a grisly affair".

References

External links 
 
 
 
 

2010s American adult animated television series
2018 American television series debuts
2019 American television series endings
American adult animated web series
American adult animated action television series
American adult animated horror television series
American adult animated superhero television series
Adult animated television shows based on DC Comics
Demons in television
English-language television shows
Television series by Warner Bros. Animation
Television shows set in London
Television shows set in Los Angeles
DC Animated Movie Universe
Television series by Blue Ribbon Content
Hellblazer